The Terrafirma Dyip first participated in the Philippine Basketball Association (PBA) draft on August 24, 2014, two months before their first PBA season. The Dyip (then-known as Kia Sorento) entered the league through expansion together with Blackwater Elite.

Manny Pacquiao became the team's first draft choice, the 11th pick in the 2014 PBA draft.

Selections

Notes
1.All players entering the draft are Filipinos until proven otherwise.

References

Philippine Basketball Association draft